This is a complete list of the Luxembourgish records in swimming, which are ratified by the Fédération Luxembourgeoise de Natation et de Sauvetage (FLNS).

Long course (50 m)

Men

Women

Mixed relay

Short Course (25 m)

Men

Women

Mixed relay

References
General
Luxembourgish Long Course Records 1 September 2022 updated
Luxembourgish Short Course Records 16 December 2022 updated
Specific

External links 
 FLNS web site

Luxembourg
Records
Swimming